Mark Ho may refer to:

Ho Chih-wei (born 1982), Taiwanese politician, Taipei City Council member from 2010 to 2018, and member of the Legislative Yuan since 2019
Ho Min-hao (born 1958), Taiwanese politician and member of the Legislative Yuan from 2002 to 2008